The following are lists of affiliates of the Telemundo television network:

List of Telemundo affiliates (by U.S. state)
List of Telemundo affiliates (table)

See also
List of Univision affiliates
List of UniMás affiliates